Aerospace Industries Organization (AIO) is a subordinate of the Iranian defence ministry and a leading high-tech complex headquartered in Tehran. It is a key player in development and production of space assets of Iran, and has some research center and factory under its control. Shahab ballistic missiles are one of notable products manufactured by the organization.

References 

Manufacturing companies based in Tehran
Government-owned companies of Iran
Aerospace companies of Iran
Ministry of Defence and Armed Forces Logistics of the Islamic Republic of Iran